Ekaterina Nikolaevna Vilkova (born 11 July 1984) is a Russian actress. She is known for her roles in Black Lightning (2009), Hipsters (2008), The PyraMMMid (2011), and Disney's The Last Bogatyr (2017) and its sequels.

Early life 
Was born on 11 July 1984 in Gorky (now called Nizhny Novgorod), which was then part of the USSR. In 2003, she graduated from the Nizhny Novgorod Theatre School. In 2006, she graduated from the Moscow Art Theatre School.

Career 
She appeared in the plays No Part from His Love by Alexander Volodin and She, Katya Kozlova directed by Viktor Ryzhakov.

From 2010 to 2011, she participated in the TV show Ice and Fire on Channel One.

In 2010, she starred in the video for the song "You Know" by Alexander Lominsky, and in 2012 she starred in the video for Dan Balan's song "Love".

Personal life 
On 1 May 2011, she married Russian actor Ilya Lyubimov.
On 11 February 2012, she gave birth to a daughter named Pavla. On 6 April 2014, she gave birth to a son named Peter.

Filmography

References

External links 

 
 Ekaterin Vilkova in ruskino.ru 
 Interview at Newsinfo 
 Ekaterina Vilkova in Rossiyskaya Gazeta 
 Ekaterina Vilkova in kino-teatr.ru 

1984 births
Living people
Actors from Nizhny Novgorod
Russian film actresses
Russian television actresses
Russian stage actresses
21st-century Russian actresses
Moscow Art Theatre
Moscow Art Theatre School alumni